Vivendi Games was an American video game holding company founded in July 1996. It published games through various subsidiaries and labels, such as Black Label Games, Blizzard Entertainment (Diablo), Coktel Vision, Fox Interactive, NDA Productions, Sierra Entertainment, Universal Interactive and Vivendi Games Mobile. In December 2007, Activision announced a proposed merger deal with Vivendi Games that would create a new holding company named Activision Blizzard. The deal was approved by Activision's shareholders on July 8, 2008, and the merger was finalized on July 10, creating Activision Blizzard while dissolving Vivendi Games.

Titles 
The list does not include titles from Blizzard Entertainment.

2001

2002

2003

2004

2005

2006

2007

2008

2009

Vivendi Games Mobile

References 

Vivendi